The mountain robin (Petroica bivittata), also known as subalpine robin, alpine robin or  cloud-forest robin, is a species of bird in the family Petroicidae. It is found sparsely throughout the New Guinea Highlands.

Its natural habitat is subtropical or tropical moist montane forests and subalpine shrubland.  The robin eats insects, caught in flight.

Two subspecies have been noted, Petroica bivittata bivittata and Petroica bivittata caudata.

References

mountain robin
Birds of New Guinea
Endemic fauna of New Guinea
mountain robin
mountain robin